Rachel de Queiroz (November 17, 1910 – November 4, 2003) was a Brazilian author, translator and journalist.

Biography 

Rachel de Queiroz was born on 17 November 1910 in Fortaleza, capital of the northeastern state of Ceará. During her childhood, her family spent a couple of years in Rio de Janeiro and Belém before moving back to Fortaleza.

She began her career in journalism in 1927 under the pen name "Rita de Queiroz". She entered the national spotlight with the unexpected success of her debut novel O Quinze in 1930. She published another three novels before moving to Rio in 1939. She was also renowned for her chronicles, short topical newspaper pieces.

In 1964 she became Brazil's representative to the UN, and in 1977 she became the first female writer to enter the Academia Brasileira de Letras. She won the Camões Prize (1993) and the Prêmio Jabuti.

She died of a heart attack in her apartment in Leblon, Rio de Janeiro on 4 November 2003, about two weeks before her 93rd birthday.

The Brazilian Marines' base in the UN peacekeeping mission in Haiti (MINUSTAH) is named after her.

Legacy 

Her novel O Quinze was made into a film in 2004.

On November 17, 2017, Google celebrated her 107th birthday with a Google Doodle.

Works

Novels 
 (1930) O Quinze
 (1932) João Miguel
 (1937) O caminho das pedras
 (1939) As três Marias
 (1950) O galo de ouro
 (1975) Dora Doralina
 (1992) Memorial de Maria Moura

Drama 
 (1953) Lampião
 (1958) A Beata Maria do Egito

Collections of chronicles 
 (1963) O brasileiro perplexo
 (1967) O caçador de tatu
 (1976) As menininhas e outras crônicas

Non-fiction 
 (1998) Tantos anos (co-authored with her sister, Maria Luíza)

References

External links 

 
 Hope.edu Biography
 

1910 births
2003 deaths
Brazilian women journalists
Brazilian women novelists
Members of the Brazilian Academy of Letters
People from Fortaleza
Camões Prize winners
20th-century Brazilian women writers
French–Portuguese translators
20th-century translators
20th-century Brazilian novelists
Brazilian Communist Party politicians
National Renewal Alliance politicians